C. esculenta  may refer to:

 Canna esculenta, a garden plant
 Collocalia esculenta, the glossy swiftlet, a bird species found in Asia
 Colocasia esculenta, the taro or eddoe, a tropical plant species grown primarily for its edible corms

See also
 List of Latin and Greek words commonly used in systematic names#E